Hibiscus sturtii is a common plant found in inland Australia. Two forms are recognized; var. sturtii and var. muelleri.

References

sturtii
Flora of New South Wales
Flora of South Australia
Flora of Queensland
Flora of the Northern Territory
Flora of Western Australia